Matthew "Matt" Halischuk (born June 1, 1988) is a Canadian former professional ice hockey right winger. He played in the National Hockey League (NHL) with the New Jersey Devils, Nashville Predators and Winnipeg Jets. Halischuk is of Ukrainian descent.

Playing career
Halischuk was drafted 117th overall in the 2007 NHL Entry Draft by the New Jersey Devils. He was drafted from the Ontario Hockey League (OHL) where he played for the Kitchener Rangers and the Toronto St. Michael's Majors. He was selected to Team Canada for the 2008 IIHF World U20 Championship. At the Under-20 Championship, he scored the game-winning goal in overtime of the gold medal game.

Halischuk made his professional debut in the 2008–09 season with the Lowell Devils, the American Hockey League (AHL) affiliate of the New Jersey Devils. He played his first NHL game against the Toronto Maple Leafs on October 29, 2008, at the Prudential Center and recorded an assist before returning to Lowell for the remainder of the year. In the following season, 2009–10, Halischuk scored his first NHL goal, against José Théodore in a 5–2 victory over the Washington Capitals on November 14, 2009.

On June 19, 2010, Halischuk was traded by the Devils (along with a second round draft pick) to the Nashville Predators in exchange for Predators' captain Jason Arnott. On April 30, 2011, Halischuk scored the game-winning goal in the second overtime of Game 2 of the Western Conference Semifinal series against the Vancouver Canucks to even the series at 1–1. It was Nashville's first ever win in the second round of the playoffs.

On July 7, 2011, Halischuk signed a two-year contract with the Predators. After the lockout-shortened 2012–13 season, Halischuk was not given a qualifying offer by the Predators, releasing him as a free agent. On July 11, 2013, he signed a one-year contract with the Winnipeg Jets. On July 1, 2015, Halischuk resigned with the Jets with a one-year, $750,000 contract. On December 17, 2015 Halischuk was recalled to the Winnipeg Jets.

On October 29, 2016, Halischuk signed a contract with the Iserlohn Roosters of the Deutsche Eishockey Liga (DEL), Germany's top league. He made 23 appearances for the Roosters, tallying four goals and six assists, before parting ways with the team on January 23, 2017.

Personal life
Halischuk is married to Erin Pryde of London, Ontario. Their marriage took place on July 12, 2014.

Career statistics

Regular season and playoffs

International

Awards and honours

References

External links

1988 births
Living people
Canadian people of Ukrainian descent
Ice hockey people from Toronto
Iserlohn Roosters players
Lowell Devils players
Manitoba Moose players
Milwaukee Admirals players
Nashville Predators players
New Jersey Devils draft picks
New Jersey Devils players
Toronto St. Michael's Majors players
Winnipeg Jets players
Canadian ice hockey right wingers